Karen Carpenter is the only solo album by singer/drummer Karen Carpenter of the Carpenters, recorded between 1979 and 1980 and released by A&M Records in 1996. It has sold around one million copies worldwide.

Background
The album was recorded in New York with producer Phil Ramone in 1979 and 1980, during the time that her brother Richard was being treated for an addiction to Quaaludes. Some of the songs from the album were later featured on the Carpenters' 1989 compilation Lovelines and later releases. In the liner notes, Karen dedicated the project to her brother Richard, "with all my heart". The liner notes (including comments from Richard Carpenter and producer Phil Ramone) include Richard's explanation for shelving the album in 1980, and his later decision to release it as Karen approved it. Karen was backed by various New York and Los Angeles studio musicians, including Steve Gadd, Greg Phillinganes, Louis Johnson and members of Billy Joel's band.

Refusal and posthumous release
A&M executives in New York approved the material, but the executives in Los Angeles, including label owners Herb Alpert and Jerry Moss, responded negatively. Ramone recalls that Carpenter broke down in tears. Devastated, she accepted A&M's urging not to release the album. Richard Carpenter later said that the decision not to release the album was Karen's, who respected the opinions of A&M executives and others—including him. Several musicians who worked on the album have said that Carpenter very much wanted her album to be released and that it was not her idea or decision to shelve it.

An episode of E! True Hollywood Story profiling Karen Carpenter claims that Herb Alpert called the album "unreleaseable". Quincy Jones championed releasing the album to Derek Green, an A&M Records vice-president, but Alpert, Moss and Green insisted the album had to be canceled. The production of the album cost $400,000 of Carpenter's own money and $100,000 fronted by A&M Records. The $100,000 fronted by A&M was offset against Carpenters' future album royalties.

On February 3, 1983, the day before Carpenter's death, she called Ramone to discuss the album; according to Ramone, Carpenter said, "I hope you don't mind if I curse. I still love our fucking record!" It remained shelved until 1996—thirteen years after Carpenter's death. The songs on the album were mixed according to Carpenter's instructions. Out of the twenty-one songs recorded, only eleven were chosen for the album. While the album was being prepared for release, an individual at A&M copied Carpenter's unreleased and unfinished material on a cassette tape and distributed it via a fan club on Yahoo! through the mail. The songs were leaked onto the internet in 2000. Two of the unreleased songs, "I Love Makin' Love to You" and "Truly You" were finished, while the remaining tracks were work leads only and in different stages of completion.

Track listing

 appeared on the Carpenters album Lovelines

Unreleased tracks
The following are a list of songs that Karen Carpenter recorded that never made it onto the album; however, they all circulate via bootlegging circles in studio quality.

Personnel

Musicians
 Karen Carpenter – vocals
 Greg Phillinganes – keyboards, keyboard solo (1)
 Richard Tee – keyboards 
 Bob James – keyboards, orchestration (1, 6, 9), arrangements (2, 3, 6, 9), keyboard solo (6)
 Rob Mounsey – keyboards, orchestration (5, 10, 11), keyboard solo (10), arrangements (10, 11)
 David Brown – guitar, guitar solo (7, 11)
 Russell Javors – guitar
 David Williams – guitar
 Eric Johns-Rasmussen – guitar
 Louis Johnson – bass
 Doug Stegmeyer – bass
 John Robinson – drums
 Steve Gadd – drums
 Liberty DeVitto – drums
 Ralph MacDonald – percussion
 Airto Moreira – percussion
 Michael Brecker – saxophone solo (3)
 Timmy Cappello – saxophone solo (4)
 Rod Temperton – arrangements (1, 5, 8), vocal arrangements (all)
 Jerry Hey – orchestration (3, 8)
 Peter Cetera – backing vocals (4), arrangements (4)

Production
 Producer – Phil Ramone
 Engineers – Glenn Berger, Ray Gerhardt and James Guthrie
 Remixing – Jim Boyer and Phil Ramone
 Recorded at A&R Studios (New York, NY); Kendun Recorders (Burbank, CA); A&M Studios (Hollywood, CA)
 Original mastering by Ted Jensen at Sterling Sound (New York, NY)
 Remastered by Dave Collins at A&M Mastering Studios (Los Angeles, CA)
 Art direction – Chuck Beeson 
 Design – Chuck Beeson and Rebecca Chamlee
 Photography – Claude Mougin
 Photo colorist – Amy Nagasawa 
 Liner notes – Richard Carpenter and Phil Ramone

References

Karen Carpenter albums
1996 debut albums
Albums published posthumously
Albums produced by Phil Ramone
A&M Records albums